Walter Giffard, 2nd Earl of Buckingham (died 1164) was an English peer.

He inherited the earldom in 1102 from his father Walter Giffard, 1st Earl of Buckingham, and died without issue in 1164 (during the reign of King Henry II); he was buried in Nutley, Sussex. His estate was divided between William Marshal, Earl of Pembroke, and Richard de Clare, Earl of Hertford who were the two heirs of Rohais, sister of the first Earl of Buckingham.

References
http://thepeerage.com/p18737.htm#i187361

02
1164 deaths
Year of birth unknown
People from Wealden District